7×54mm may refer to:

 7×54mm Finnish
 7×54mm Fournier